Commandment is the seventh studio album by American death metal band Six Feet Under. It was released April 17, 2007, on Metal Blade Records. Music videos were released for "Ghosts of the Undead" and "Doomsday". "Doomsday" was premiered on Headbangers Ball on November 10.

Track listing

Personnel 
Six Feet Under
Chris Barnes – vocals
Steve Swanson – guitars
Terry Butler – bass
Greg Gall – drums
Production
Produced by Chris Barnes
Recorded by Chris Carroll
Engineered by Erik Rutan, Chris Carroll and Javier Valverde
Mixed and mastered by Erik Rutan at Mana Recording Studios
Artwork
Photography by Joe Giron
Cover art by Meran Karanitant

References 

2007 albums
Six Feet Under (band) albums
Metal Blade Records albums